Üzengili can refer to:

 Üzengili, Bayburt
 Üzengili, Karayazı